The Achatinoidea are a superfamily of air-breathing land snails and slugs, terrestrial gastropod mollusks in the informal group Sigmurethra.

2005 taxonomy
According to taxonomy of the Gastropoda by Bouchet & Rocroi, 2005 there are four families within the superfamily Achatinoidea, that is based on the study by Nordsieck, published in 1986.

Family Achatinidae Swainson, 1840
Family Ferussaciidae Bourguignat, 1883
Family Micractaeonidae Schileyko, 1999
Family Subulinidae P. Fischer & Crosse, 1877

2017 taxonomy
Fontanilla et al. recognized Subulinidae as not monophyletic in 2017 and they classified Subulininae within Achatinidae.
 Family Achatinidae Swainson, 1840
 Family Aillyidae H. B. Baker, 1955
 Family Ferussaciidae Bourguignat, 1883
 Family Micractaeonidae Schileyko, 1999

References

External links

Stylommatophora